Cheongju Broadcasting or CJB is a Radio and TV station in Cheongju, affiliated with the SBS Network.

Stations

 Television
Channel - Ch. 49 (LCN 6-1)
Launched - October 18, 1997
Affiliated to - SBS
Call Sign - HLDR-DTV
 FM radio (CJB JOY FM)
Frequency - FM 101.5 MHz (Cheongju), FM 97.9 MHz (Chungju), FM 102.7 MHz (Jecheon)
Launched - September 26, 2001 (Cheongju), December 14, 2011 (Chungju), August 23, 2013 (Jecheon)
Affiliated to - SBS Power FM
Call Sign - HLDR-FM

See also
SBS (Korea)

External links
 

Seoul Broadcasting System affiliates
Television channels and stations established in 1997
Radio stations established in 2001
Mass media in Cheongju